Autour d'une cabine (Around A Cabin), original full title  (Around a Cabin or Misadventures of a Couple at the Seaside), is an 1894 French short animated film directed by Émile Reynaud. It is an animated film made of 636 individually images hand painted in 1893. The film showed off Emile's invention, the Théâtre Optique. It was shown at the Musée Grévin from December 1894 until March 1900.

Plot
The film consists of a series of animations on a beach containing two beach huts and a diving board. Two characters play at diving into the water from the diving board and then appear on the beach. The woman begins to play with a small dog and is then joined by a gentleman. The two play around on the beach before getting changed into bathing costumes and going into the water. They bob up and down in the water before swimming out of the scene. Once the couple have gone, a man sails out in a boat.

References

External links

, note this does not show the film in the sequence or frame rate as it was shown in the 1890s
 

1894 films
French silent short films
1890s animated short films
1894 comedy films
1894 short films
Films directed by Émile Reynaud
French animated short films
French comedy short films
Films about water sports
Silent films in color
Animated films without speech
Silent comedy films
1890s French films
Films set on beaches